William Michael Urbanski (June 5, 1903 in Linoleumville, New York – July 12, 1973 in Perth Amboy, New Jersey), was a professional baseball player who played infield in the Major Leagues from -. He would play for the Boston Braves.

External links

1903 births
1973 deaths
Major League Baseball infielders
Boston Braves players
Sportspeople from Staten Island
Baseball players from New York City